Ølensvåg or Ølsvågen is a village in Vindafjord municipality in Rogaland county, Norway.  The village is located at the southwestern end of the Ølsfjorden, along the European route E134 highway, just west of the municipal centre of Ølensjøen.  The village was historically a part of the municipality of Ølen, which was merged into Vindafjord in 2006.

References

Villages in Rogaland
Vindafjord